Miguel Maria Giambelli (March 23, 1920 – December 26, 2010) was a Brazilian prelate of the Roman Catholic Church.

Giambelli, born in Flero, Italy was ordained a priest on July 4, 1943 from the Roman Catholic religious order Clerics Regular of Saint Paul. He was appointed Bishop of the Diocese of Guamá on April 21, 1980 and was ordained bishop on June 15, 1980. The diocese would be renamed to the Diocese of Bragança do Pará in October 1981. Giambelli served until his retirement on April 10, 1996

See also
Diocese of Bragança do Pará
Clerics Regular of Saint Paul

External links
Catholic-Hierarchy

20th-century Roman Catholic bishops in Brazil
Italian Roman Catholic bishops in South America
1920 births
2010 deaths
Barnabites
Barnabite bishops
Roman Catholic bishops of Bragança do Pará